Living Dead Girl is a low-budget short horror film directed by Jon Springer. The film stars Mark Borchardt who is best known as the subject of the cult documentary American Movie (1999). "Living Dead Girl" is a silent-film zombie parody with extremely graphic gore effects.

Plot 
A zombie horde overtakes the Mall of America. Meanwhile, we see a man named Tom feverishly barricading the inside of his house, only to have his not-too-bright girlfriend open a window to let some fresh air in.

The ghouls enter and overtake the couple, but only after a valiant attempt by Tom to decimate the invaders with his .357 magnum. During the struggle, Tom's last bullet accidentally discharges into Barbara's femoral artery. Barbara bleeds to death in the hallway as Tom is devoured.

The next day, Barbara stumbles through downtown St. Paul as a newly activated zombie. She encounters Jesus Christ on a street corner and bites a huge bloody chunk out of his forearm. Barbara continues on, walking aimlessly through the empty city; she eventually collapses on the sidewalk. Barbara's appearance changes back to normal as she returns to life.

Cast 
Mark Borchardt – Jesus
Nadine Gross – Barbara
Mehrdad Sarlak – Tom
Charles Hubbell – Lead Zombie
Robert Elliot – T-shirt Zombie
Harrison Matthews – Redneck Zombie
Jennifer Prettyman – Chick Zombie

Release 
The film premiered at the 2004 Fantasia Film Festival in Montreal, Canada.

See also 
List of zombie short films and undead-related projects

References

External links 
Production Company Website
Living Dead Girl on the Internet Movie Database

Zombie short films
2004 horror films
2004 short films
American zombie films
2004 films
Parodies of horror
2000s English-language films
American horror short films
2000s American films